Savina Ski Jumping Center is a ski jumping complex located in Ljubno ob Savinji, Slovenia.

History
The first ski jumping competition in Ljubno was held in 1931. In 1949, the construction of the new K60 hill began. The hill was planned and constructed by Stanko Bloudek, who also constructed the Letalnica bratov Gorišek ski flying hill. The construction was completed in 1952. The smaller training hills (K18 nad K20) were constructed in 1974 and 1955, respectively. The local ski jumping club SSK Ljubno was founded in 1973. In 1983, the K20 hill was covered with plastic mate. In 2005, the venue was reconstructed according to the modern regulations set by the International Ski Federation. In 2015, the venue underwent major renovation.

As of 1 January 2023, the venue has hosted 23 FIS Women's Ski Jumping World Cup events.

World Cup results

Women's

References
General

Specific

External links
Official website

Ski jumping venues in Slovenia
Sports venues completed in 1952
1952 establishments in Yugoslavia